Stoller is a surname. Notable people with the surname include:

Alvin Stoller (1925–1992), American jazz drummer
Bryan Michael Stoller (born 1960), award-winning independent filmmaker
Debbie Stoller, New York Times best-selling American author, publisher and feminist pundit
Ethan Stoller, American composer and producer from Chicago, Illinois
Ezra Stoller (1915–2004), American architectural photographer
Fabian Stoller (born 1988), Swiss football midfielder
Fred Stoller (born 1965), American stand-up comedian, actor, writer, voice artist
Jennie Stoller (1946 – 2018), British actress
Mike Stoller (born 1933), American songwriter and record producer of the duo Jerry Leiber and Mike Stoller
Leo Stoller (born 1946), American self-styled intellectual property entrepreneur
Nicholas Stoller (born 1976), English–American screenwriter and director
Paul Stoller (born 1947), American anthropologist
Robert Stoller (1924–1991), American psychoanalyst
Roger W. Stoller (born 1954), American sculptor of large works integrating bronze and granite
Sam Stoller (1915–1985), American sprinter and long jumper
Shmuel Stoller (1898–1977), Israeli agronomist and an early member of the Zionist movement.

See also
Staller
Stollen
Stollers
Stollery
Stohler

Jewish surnames